Krishna Menon Memorial Government Women's College is an educational institution in Kannur, India.

Courses offered

Under Graduate programmes:

 B.A. Economics with National reconstruction in Modern India and Political Science
 B.A. Economics with Mathematical Economics and Mathematics for Economic Analysis
 B.A. English with Journalism & Cultural History of Britain
 B.A. History with Political Science and General Economics
 B.A. Malayalam with Sanskrit
 B.Sc. Chemistry with Mathematics & Physics
 B.Sc. Mathematics with Physics and Computer Science
 B.Sc. Physics with Mathematics & Computer Science

Post Graduate programmes:

 M.A. English
 M.A. Development Economics

Affiliation

Krishna Menon Memorial Government Women's College, Kannur is affiliated to the Kannur University.

See also
 
 Kannur University
 Sir Syed College
 Payyannur College

References 

Colleges affiliated to Kannur University
Women's universities and colleges in Kerala
Universities and colleges in Kannur district